Chandkheda is a well-developed area in northwestern Ahmedabad . It is situated on west of Sabarmati River.

History
On 19 January 2008, Chandkheda Panchayat was included under Ahmedabad Municipal Corporation's jurisdiction and ceased to exist as a separate civic body.

Demographics
As of 2001 India census, Chandkheda had a population of 55,477. Males constitute 53% of the population and females 47%. Chandkheda has an average literacy rate of 81%, higher than the national average of 59.5%; with male literacy of 85% and female literacy of 77%. 11% of the population is under 6 years of age.

Mostly populated by employees of ONGC and some small scale businessmen, this village is situated at a height and is thus almost never affected by floods which usually ravage low-lying areas as satellite almost every year. It has a post office, several banks, schools, and a railway station earlier Meter Gauge, Now converted to Broad Gauge, shop and business too.

Development
Chandkheda has developed into a residential area mostly because of the ONGC office situated nearby. Most of the officers choose to stay in this suburb of Ahmedabad rather than in the busy city itself. The ONGC colony has a club, a Kendriya Vidyalaya, a dispensary and an open ground in addition to other facilities. There are many housing societies in the area.

New C.G.Road
The newly developed 100 ft wide "New C.G. Road" (Chandkheda-Gandhinagar) road is a residential area. It includes the Vishwakarma Government Engineering College (VGEC). This college was also a temporary campus for IIT Gandhinagar during its early stages. VGEC is now the campus for GTU university. There are several schools and educational institutes situated here.

4D Square Mall

4D Square Mall is a shopping mall situated near Visat-Gandhinagar highway. There are many brand stores such as Puma, United Colors of Benetton, Nike and many more. There is a PVR Cinemas multiplex. Some fast food restaurants like Domino's Pizza, Subway (restaurant), etc. are also there.

Jantanagar
Jantanagar, officially known as Parshwanath nagar, is a residential area near ONGC colony and New C.G. road. Jantanagar has around 1000+ houses. Having these many houses, Jantanagar is considered as the second largest residential society in Chandkheda after Gujarat Housing Board.

Gujarat Housing Board
The Gujarat Housing Board is a neighborhood near Jantanagar in Chandkheda area.

See also 
Gujarat Technological University
Motera
Vishwakarma Government Engineering College
 Shree Shakti Industries

References

Neighbourhoods in Ahmedabad